Shimshon Bichler is an educator who teaches political economy at colleges and universities in Israel. Along with Jonathan Nitzan, Bichler has created a power theory of capitalism and theory of differential accumulation in their analysis of the political economy of wars, Israel, and globalization.

Work
Nitzan and Bichler share an intellectual legacy with institutional political economists such as Thorstein Veblen. In particular, they share Veblen's explanation that business exists with the end of pecuniary (monetary) gain and not the accumulation of goods of consumption or of physical machines.

According to their power theory of value (introduced in their Capital as Power: A Study of Order and Creorder, published 2009), in capitalism, power is the governing principle as rooted in the centrality of private ownership. Private ownership is wholly and only an act of institutionalized exclusion, and institutionalized exclusion is a matter of organized power.

Major works
 Nitzan, Jonathan and Shimshon Bichler – Global Political Economy of Israel – 2002
 Nitzan, Jonathan and Shimshon Bichler – Capital as Power: A Study of Order and Creorder – 2009

References

External links
 The Bichler and Nitzan Archives - free resource of their articles

Institutional economists
21st-century Israeli writers
21st-century  Israeli economists
Living people
Year of birth missing (living people)